Enplug was an American technology company headquartered in Culver City, California that offers software for digital displays, allowing real-time social media interaction between brands and users. The company was a software licensing business.

Enplug was acquired by Spectrio in 2021.

History
Enplug was part of the emerging Los Angeles startup community, dubbed "Silicon Beach" The company was a graduate of StartEngine, founded by Howard Marks, in September 2012. Since its founding, the company had received awards such as placement on both the Inc. Magazine and Forbes 30 Under 30 lists.

Funding
In April, 2014, Enplug raised $2.5 million through seed funding, which came from a number of investors, such as Larry Keele, co-founder of Oaktree Capital Management; Rasoul Oskouy, founding member of Juniper Networks; Bill Gross, founder of Idealab; Hossein Eslambolchi, former president and CTO at AT&T; David Cohen, Executive Vice President at Interscope Records; Justin Caldbeck, managing director at Lightspeed Venture Partners; Troy Carter, CEO at Atom Factory; Activision co-founder Howard Marks; Amidi Group, DominateFund, and zPark Venture.

Product
Enplug's social media displays allow end-users to interact with brands in real-time through their existing social media accounts. Enplug displays support multiple social media apps, including Twitter, Facebook, Yelp, Foursquare, and Instagram using a business's custom hashtag. Enplug's software is flexible, where it isn't limited to its own use, and allows customers to customize by installing apps created by third-party developers. The company generated a SDK, where developers can create and sell apps.

The displays also act as advertising space for partners. Content can be deployed by advertisers, to a screen of their choice. Enplug is a SaaS platform, where business owners pay to access its software on a monthly basis.

Culture
Enplug had received press coverage in relation to its company culture. As of last year, 12 of the 37 employees lived and worked out of a six-bedroom, three-bathroom Ranch-style house in Bel Air, California.

For most employees, the company paid for "food, rent, and utilities." The Wall Street Journal wrote of Enplug's culture in an article about the company: "Employees and managers meet, work, eat, clean, exercise and sleep in the same space. And while there are occasional uncomfortable moments, such as nudging your boss to do the dishes, companies like Enplug say it is good for professional relationships, saves on rent and travel costs and is often just plain fun." Forbes reported that the purpose of living together was for the employees to "blur the lifestyle divide" between work and living. The culture is very important to Enplug. CEO Nanxi Liu stated, “I actually think the company would have failed if we didn’t live together."

References

2012 establishments in California
2021 disestablishments in California
2021 mergers and acquisitions
Companies based in Los Angeles
American companies established in 2012
American companies disestablished in 2021
Display technology companies
Defunct software companies of the United States
Software companies established in 2012
Software companies disestablished in 2021